Return of the Daleks is a Big Finish Productions audio drama based on the long-running British science fiction television series Doctor Who.

Synopsis
The secret resistance led by Susan Mendes and Kalendorf encounters the Seventh Doctor on the planet Zaleria during Dalek occupation — a planet which hides a secret of its own.

Cast
The Doctor — Sylvester McCoy
Kalendorf — Gareth Thomas
Susan Mendes — Sarah Mowat
Skerrill — Christine Brennan
Mendac — Hylton Collins
Aytrax — Jack Galagher
The Daleks — Nicholas Briggs
Dorla, Zalerian & Ogrons — Hylton Collins
Zalerian 2 & Ogrons — Jack Galagher
Ogrons & Talamar — Nicholas Briggs

Continuity
This story is set between episodes 1 and 2 of the events of the first Dalek Empire miniseries.
The planet Zaleria is revealed to be Spiridon, the planet from the 1973 serial Planet of the Daleks. The Daleks are planning to thaw out the Dalek army frozen at the end of that story.
The script for this play is published in the short story collection Short Trips: Dalek Empire.

External links
Big Finish Productions – Return of the Daleks

2006 audio plays
Seventh Doctor audio plays
Dalek audio plays
Audio plays by Nicholas Briggs